Through Soft Air is the first short story collection from Australian speculative fiction writer Lee Battersby. Printed in 2006, it was published by US Publisher Prime Books.

Stories
The collection contains the following stories:
 Father Muerte & the Theft
 Silk
 Carrying the God
 Pass the Parcel
 Through the Window Merrilee Dances
 Elyse (previously unpublished)
 The Divergence Tree
 Jaracara's Kiss (previously unpublished)
 The Hobbyist
 Mikal (previously unpublished)
 Letters to Josie
 A Stone to Mark My Passing
 Vortle
 Ecdysis
 A Very Good Lawyer
 Goodfellow
 Stalag Hollywood (previously unpublished)
 Brillig
 His Calliope(previously unpublished)
 Father Renoir's Hands (previously unpublished)
 Through Soft Air
 Dark Ages (previously unpublished)
 Tales of Nireym
 Father Muerte & the Rain
 Pater Familias

The cover art is by Gary Nurrish.

See also
 Lee Battersby

External links
 Lee Battersby's home page
 Prime Books
 Review from Horrorscope
 Reviews from Ticonderoga Online  	 
 Reviews from ASif!

2006 short story collections
Australian short story collections
Horror short story collections
Prime Books books